An adder stone is a type of stone, usually glassy, with a naturally occurring hole through it. Such stones, which usually consist of flint, have been discovered by archaeologists in both Britain and Egypt. Commonly, they are found in Northern Germany at the coasts of the North and Baltic Seas.

In Britain they are also called hag stones, witch stones, serpent's eggs, snake's eggs, or Glain Neidr in Wales, milpreve in Cornwall, adderstanes in the south of Scotland and Gloine nan Druidh ("Druids' glass" in Scottish Gaelic) in the north. In Germany they are called Hühnergötter ("chicken gods"). In Egypt they are called aggry or aggri.

Various traditions exist as to the origins of adder stones. One holds that the stones are the hardened saliva of large numbers of serpents massing together, the perforations being caused by their tongues. There are other claims that an adder stone comes from the head of a serpent or is made by the sting of an adder. The more modern and perhaps easier to attain artefact would be any rock with a hole bored through the middle by water. Human intervention (i.e., direction of water or placement of the stone) is not allowed.

In Pliny's Natural History
According to Ancient Roman natural philosopher Pliny’s Natural History, book XIX, adder stone was held in high esteem amongst the Druids. Pliny described rituals the druids allegedly conducted to acquire the stone, and the magical properties they ascribed to it. He wrote:

 There is a sort of egg in great repute among the Gauls, of which the Greek writers have made no mention. A vast number of serpents are twisted together in summer, and coiled up in an artificial knot by their saliva and slime; and this is called "the serpent's egg". The druids say that it is tossed in the air with hissings and must be caught in a cloak before it touches the earth. The person who thus intercepts it, flies on horseback; for the serpents will pursue him until prevented by intervening water. This egg, though bound in gold will swim against the stream. And the magi are cunning to conceal their frauds, they give out that this egg must be obtained at a certain age of the moon. I have seen that egg as large and as round as a common sized apple, in a chequered cartilaginous cover, and worn by the Druids. It is wonderfully extolled for gaining lawsuits, and access to kings. It is a badge which is worn with such ostentation, that I knew a Roman knight, a Vocontian, who was slain by the stupid emperor Claudius, merely because he wore it in his breast when a lawsuit was pending.

In Welsh mythology
The Glain Neidr or Maen Magi of Welsh folklore is also closely connected to Druidism. The Glain Neidr of Wales are believed to be created by a congress of snakes, normally occurring in spring, but most auspicious on May Eve.

Although not named as Glain Neidr, magic stones with the properties of adder stones appear frequently in Welsh mythology and folklore. The Mabinogion, translated into English in the mid-nineteenth century by Lady Charlotte Guest, mentions such stones on two occasions. In the story of Peredur son of Efrawg (Percival of the Arthurian cycle), in a departure from Chrétien de Troyes' Perceval, the Story of the Grail, Peredur is given a magical stone that allows him to see and kill an invisible creature called the Addanc. In another tale, Owain, or the Lady of the Fountain (Ywain of Arthurian legend), the hero Owain mab Urien is trapped in the gatehouse of a castle. He is given a stone by a maiden, which turns Owain invisible, allowing him to escape capture.

In Russian mythology 
In Russian folklore, adder stones were believed to be the abodes of spirits called Kurinyi Bog ("The Chicken God"). Kurinyi Bog were the guardians of chickens, and their stones were placed into farmyards to counteract the possible evil effects of the Kikimora (The wives of the Domovoi, the house spirits.) Kikimora, who also guarded and took care of chickens, could often unleash misery upon hens they did not like by plucking out their feathers.

In English Folklore 
In the seaside town Hastings there is a local legend that the town is under an enchantment known as Crowley's Curse, said to have been conjured by Aleister Crowley who lived in Hastings at the end of his life. The curse compells anyone who has lived in Hastings to always return, no matter how far away they move, or for how long. The curse can only be broken by taking a stone with a hole running through it from Hastings beach.

See also

 Creirwy
 Druid
 List of mythological objects
 Omarolluk and Pholad borings, other rocks with curious but naturally created holes.
 Toadstone

References 

 Henkin, Leo J. "The Carbuncle in the Adder's Head." Modern Language Notes, Vol. 58, No. 1 (Jan., 1943), pp. 34–39.
ghostvillage.com: Dictionary of Superstitions A-Z
 Witchcraft & second sight in the Highlands & islands of Scotland. John Gregorson Campbell, pg 84.
 (Gloine)

Egyptian mythology
Mythological objects
Scottish folklore
Welsh folklore
Druidry
Magic items